Mikhail Mikhailovich Yudovich (8 June 1911 in Roslavl – 19 September 1987 in Moscow) was a Soviet chess master, journalist, and writer.

Chess career 
In 1930, Yudovich tied for 5–9th in the Moscow Championship. In 1931, he took 4th in the same event, and shared 3rd in the 7th USSR Championship in Moscow (Mikhail Botvinnik won). He was the Soviet Correspondence Champion in 1966.

Yudovich was awarded the titles of International Master (IM) in 1950, International Master of Correspondence Chess (IMC) in 1961, and Grandmaster of Correspondence Chess (GMC) in 1973.

References

External links 
 
 

1911 births
1987 deaths
Soviet chess players
Jewish chess players
Chess International Masters
People from Roslavlsky District
Russian Jews